Prosopis laevigata, commonly known as smooth mesquite, is a species of flowering tree in the pea family, Fabaceae, that is native to Mexico, Bolivia, Peru, and north-western Argentina (Jujuy Province). In Mexico, the species is found in the nation's the central highlands, the lowlands of southern Tamaulipas, and in parts of Oaxaca, Morelos, Puebla, and Chiapas. It grows on a variety of sites on hillslides, in depressions, and along floodplains. It has been spotted growing in the Middle East as well.

References

laevigata
Plants described in 1962
Trees of Argentina
Trees of Bolivia
Trees of Mexico
Trees of Peru
Flora of Northeastern Mexico
Least concern plants
Taxa named by Aimé Bonpland
Taxa named by Alexander von Humboldt
Taxonomy articles created by Polbot